The Lycée Français International de Porto is a French international school in Porto, Portugal. Its education ranges from maternelle (preschool) to lycée (senior high school). The French School of Porto was formally inaugurated on 30 October 1963  by the Ambassador of France in Lisbon M. De Beauverger.

References

External links

 Lycée Français International de Porto 

Porto
International schools in Porto